Michael John Sheridan (March 4, 1945 – September 27, 2022) was an American prelate of the Catholic Church who served as bishop of the Diocese of Colorado Springs in Colorado from 2003 to 2021. He previously served as an auxiliary bishop for the Archdiocese of Saint Louis in Missouri from 1997 to 2003.

Biography

Early life 
Michael Sheridan was born in St. Louis, Missouri, to John and Bernice (née Moore) Sheridan. In 1951, he started attending Corpus Christi Catholic School in Jennings, Missouri. He then went to St. Louis University High School in St. Louis in 1959, graduating in 1963.

Sheridan attended Rockhurst College in Kansas City, Missouri, for one year before entering Cardinal Glennon College Seminary in Shrewsbury, Missouri. He graduated in 1967 from Cardinal Glennon with a Bachelor of Philosophy degree. Sheridan then entered Kenrick Seminary in St. Louis.

Priesthood 
On May 29, 1971, Sheridan was ordained to the priesthood by then Archbishop John Carberry for the Archdiocese of St. Louis. After his ordination, Sheridan performed pastoral work at parishes in the archdiocese. He also taught on the theological faculty of Kenrick-Glennon Seminary. In 1973, Sheridan was awarded a Master of Historical Theology degree from Saint Louis University.

In 1974, Sheridan went to Rome to attend Pontifical University of St. Thomas Aquinas, Angelicum, earning a Doctor of Theology degree. He returned to Rome to receive a Doctor of Sacred Theology degree in 1980 with a dissertation entitled The Theology of the Local Church in Vatican II.

In 1988, Sheridan was appointed pastor of Christ the King Parish in University City, Missouri. In 1993, he became pastor of Immacolata Parish in Richmond Heights, Missouri.

Auxiliary Bishop of St. Louis
On July 8, 1997, Pope John Paul II appointed Sheridan as an auxiliary bishop of  the Archdiocese of St. Louis and titular bishop of Thibiuca. He received his episcopal consecration on September 3, 1997, from then-Archbishop Justin Rigali, with Bishops Edward O'Donnell and Edward Braxton serving as co-consecrators. Sheridan chose as his episcopal motto: "Virtus in infirmitate perficitur" (2 Corinthians 12:9), meaning, "Strength is made perfect in weakness").

Coadjutor Bishop and Bishop of Colorado Springs 
On December 4, 2001, John Paul II appointed Sheridan as coadjutor bishop of the Diocese of Colorado Springs. On January 30, 2003, Sheridan automatically succeeded the retiring Bishop Richard Hannifen as the second bishop of the diocese. Sheridan was installed on January 30, 2002. 

Within the United States Conference of Catholic Bishops (USCCB), Sheridan sat on the Committee on Education. He was also a board member of the Pontifical North American College in Rome, the  Catholic Relief Services, the International Dominican Foundation, and the Kenrick Seminary board of trustees.

In 2004, Sheridan said that any Catholic who does not reflect church teaching in the voting booth "makes a mockery of that faith and belies his identity as a Catholic," a remark widely held to refer to Catholic supporters of then Senator John Kerry during the 2004 United States presidential election campaign. Sheridan qualified his statement by saying "...the church never directs citizens to vote for any specific candidate." Kevin Eckstrom of Religion News Service called it the first directive in the nation: "...that would apply to voters the same controversial sanctions proposed by some bishops against abortion-rights Catholic politicians...also one of the most drastic—equating a particular vote with sinful activity." Sheridan's stance drew national attention and harsh criticism, which he then softened in a column in the diocesan newspaper. Sheridan's spokesman stated that there was no communion ban on anyone and that decisions on taking communion rested with individuals and their consciences. In 2005, Sheridan's executive assistant, Peter Howard, wrote a column in the diocesan newspaper stating that participating in Protestant church services is contrary to church teaching. Sheridan then issued a public rebuttal, stating that Howard's view "does not represent my thinking on the subject".

Retirement and legacy 
On April 30, 2021, Pope Francis accepted Sheridan's letter of resignation as bishop of the Diocese of Colorado Springs, appointing Father James Golka as his replacement.Michael Sheridan died on September 27, 2022, in a Colorado Springs hospital.

See also
 

 Catholic Church hierarchy
 Catholic Church in the United States
 Historical list of the Catholic bishops of the United States
 List of Catholic bishops of the United States
 Lists of patriarchs, archbishops, and bishops

References

External links

 Diocese of Colorado Springs

Episcopal succession

1945 births
2022 deaths
Clergy from St. Louis
Roman Catholic Archdiocese of St. Louis
Pontifical University of Saint Thomas Aquinas alumni
Roman Catholic bishops of Colorado Springs
21st-century Roman Catholic bishops in the United States
Bishops appointed by Pope John Paul II
Religious leaders from Missouri